The Houndcats is an American Saturday morning cartoon series produced by DePatie–Freleng Enterprises. The series was broadcast by NBC from September 9 to December 2, 1972, with reruns continuing until September 1, 1973. Thirteen episodes were produced.

Plot
Loosely based on the CBS adventure series Mission: Impossible and the short-lived 1971 series Bearcats!, it was headed by a combined team of (three) dogs and (two) cats, hence the name, as they go on spy missions in 1914 America.

Each episode begins with the Houndcats receiving their orders from their unseen "Chief", whose message is played on an old-fashioned gramophone, player-piano or other device, parodying the tape recorder scene at the start of most episodes of Mission: Impossible. However, the words "this message will self-destruct in five seconds", always takes the Houndcats by surprise, causing them to run away from the explosion.

Members
 The "Houndcats" were led by cool and confident cat Stutz.
 Dingdog was Stutz' right-hand man. He wore a blue Civil War uniform. He was known for bad timing and bad judgment. He is a Briard.
 Mussel Mutt was the muscle – large, bulky and ever-hungry, his eyes were almost always hidden under his hat. He is an Old English Sheepdog.
 Putty Puss was a tiny cat and a disguise expert.
 Rhubarb was a dog and a scientist. He wore a long coat and a large sombrero usually revealing only his nose. His coat was full of gadgets.

Cast
 Michael Bell as Stutz, the Raven
 Joe Besser as Putty Puss
 Daws Butler as Rhubarb (three episodes), Dr. Strangeless, Grogan
 Stu Gilliam as Dingdog
 Arte Johnson as Rhubarb, Captain Blight
 Aldo Ray as Mussel Mutt
 Joan Gerber as Madame X
 Bob Holt
 John Stephenson as Doctor Doll

Production
13 half-hour episodes of the series were produced. An adult laugh track was added, as was common practice for cartoon series at the time.

Incarnations 
 The Houndcats (1972–1973) 
 The Houndcats and The Barkleys (1972–1973)

Episodes

Home media
In October 2015, Film Chest Media Group released The Barkleys and The Houndcats - 2 DVD Classic Animation Set on DVD in Region 1. This collection features all 13 episodes of the series on DVD.

Syndication
The show was previously syndicated by Viacom International, which is now CBS Television Distribution.

Staff
 Created for Television by David H. DePatie, Friz Freleng
 In Association with Ken Spears, Joe Ruby
 Writers: Woody Kling, Tom Dagenais, Don Christensen
 Animation Director: Bob McKimson
 Storyboard Directors: Gerry Chiniquy, Arthur Leonardi, Cullen Houghtaling, Paul Sommer
 Layout Supervisor and Design: Robert Taylor
 Layouts: Martin Strudler, Marty Murphy, Bob Givens, Tony Rivera, Pete Alvarado
 Animation: Don Williams, Manny Gould, Ken Muse, Norm McCabe, Bob Richardson, Warren Batchelder, John Gibbs, Jim Davis, Bob Matz, Bob Bransford, Reuben Timmins, Bob Bemiller
 Background Supervised by Richard H. Thomas, Mary O'Loughlin
 Film Editing Supervised by Lee Gunther
 Film Editors: Joe Siracusa, Roger Donley, Allan R. Potter, Rick Steward
 Voice Talents of Michael Bell, Joe Besser, Daws Butler, Stu Gilliam, Arte Johnson, Aldo Ray and Joan Gerber, Bob Holt, John Stephenson
 Title Designs by Arthur Leonardi
 Music by Doug Goodwin
 Music Score Conducted by Eric Rogers
 Music Recording Engineer: Eric A. Tomlinson
 Executive in Charge of Production: Stan Paperny
 Production Supervisor: Harry Love
 Camera: Ray Lee, Larry Hogan, John Burton, Jr.
 Production Mixer: Steve Orr
 Sound by Producer's Sound Service, Inc.
 Associate Producers: Joe Ruby, Ken Spears
 Produced by David H. DePatie, Friz Freleng

In other languages

References

External links
 
 
 The Houndcats at Don Markstein's Toonopedia. Archived from the original on February 5, 2016.

1970s American animated television series
1972 American television series debuts
Fiction set in 1914
Television series set in the 1910s
Television series by CBS Studios
1973 American television series endings
NBC original programming
Television series by DePatie–Freleng Enterprises
Animated television series about dogs
Animated television series about cats
American children's animated action television series
American children's animated adventure television series
Television series created by Joe Ruby
Television series created by Ken Spears